Phrynocephalus luteoguttatus, the yellow-speckled toad-headed agama, is a species of agamid lizard found in Iran, Afghanistan, Pakistan (Baluchistan) and possibly in India.

The type locality is between Nushki and Helmand (border between Afghanistan and Baluchistan).

References

 Boulenger, G. A. 1887 Catalogue of the Lizards in the British Museum (Nat. Hist.) III. Lacertidae, Gerrhosauridae, Scincidae, Anelytropsidae, Dibamidae, Chamaeleontidae. London: 575pp.
 Khan, M.S. 1980 Affinities and zoogeography of herptiles of Pakistan. Biologia, 26(1-2): 113-171
 Khan, M. S. 1999 A checklist and key to the phrynocephalid lizards of Pakistan, with ethnological notes (Squamata: Agamidae). Pakistan J. Zool. 31 (1): 17-24

External links
 http://itgmv1.fzk.de/www/itg/uetz/herp/photos/Prynocephalus_luteoguttatus.jpg
 http://itgmv1.fzk.de/www/itg/uetz/herp/photos/Prynocephalus_luteoguttat2.jpg
 http://itgmv1.fzk.de/www/itg/uetz/herp/photos/Prynocephalus_luteoguttatus3.jpg
 http://itgmv1.fzk.de/www/itg/uetz/herp/photos/Prynocephalus_luteoguttatus4.jpg
 http://www.biotropics.com/html/echsen.html

luteoguttatus
Reptiles of Pakistan
Reptiles described in 1887
Taxa named by George Albert Boulenger